Haiderzai is a town situated in the Pishin District of Baluchistan province, Pakistan the caste of the people is " Syed ", therefore known has Haiderzei syedan. Haiderzai comprises three villages named (1) Killi Mandan, (2) Killi Nasozai and (3) Killi Masterzai.

Culture
It is known for tobacco dealing and business all over the world. It has a bazaar known as Yaru which can supply items of everyday needs. Haiderzai has electricity, gas stations, and telephone and mobile phone services. It has famous hotels named the Ajwa Hotel Yaru and the Sharjah Hotel, which is most famous for its culture and spicy dishes, broast, rosh, saji, soap, chai and mustang cake.

References

Geography of Balochistan, Pakistan